Dance Hall (French: Maison de danses) is a 1931 French drama film directed by Maurice Tourneur and starring Gaby Morlay, Charles Vanel and Madame Ahnar.

The film's sets were designed by the art director Robert Gys.

Cast
 Gaby Morlay as Estrella 
 Charles Vanel as Ramon 
 Madame Ahnar as La Tomasa 
 Edmond Van Daële as Benito 
 José Noguéro as Luisito 
 Delphine Abdala
 Madame Sapiani as Madame 
 Christiane Tourneur as Amalia 
 Jules Mondos as Don Cristobal 
 Raymond Cordy
 Marcel Maupi

References

Bibliography 
 Dayna Oscherwitz & MaryEllen Higgins. The A to Z of French Cinema. Scarecrow Press, 2009.

External links 
 

1931 films
French drama films
1931 drama films
1930s French-language films
Films directed by Maurice Tourneur
Pathé films
French black-and-white films
1930s French films